Khoda Shahr (also Romanized as Khodā Shahr; also known as Khodashekhr) is a village in Rud Pish Rural District, in the Central District of Fuman County, Gilan Province, Iran. At the 2006 census, its population was 223, in 61 families.

References 

Populated places in Fuman County